Liamorpha is a small genus of very small sea snails, pyramidellid gastropod mollusks or micromollusks.

This genus is currently placed in the subfamily Chrysallidinae of the family Odostomiidae.

Life history
Nothing is known about the biology of the members of this genus. As is true of most members of the Pyramidellidae sensu lato, they are most likely to be ectoparasites.

Species
 Liamorpha decorata (de Folin, 1873)
 Liamorpha elegans (de Folin, 1870)
 Liamorpha gemmifera (Dautzenberg & H. Fischer, 1906)

References

 Robba E. (2013) Tertiary and Quaternary fossil pyramidelloidean gastropods of Indonesia. Scripta Geologica 144: 1-191.

External links

Pyramidellidae